Rhythm City Casino Resort is a casino and resort located in Davenport, Iowa, with over 32,000 square feet of gaming space with 1,000 slot machines, 25 table games, the Elite Sports Book, a hotel, three restaurants, a full service spa and an event center. It is adjacent to the intersection of I-80 and I-74. It is owned by Elite Casino Resorts which also owns Riverside Casino & Golf Resort in Riverside, IA and Grand Falls Casino Resort located in Lyon County, IA.

History
The casino began as a riverboat casino named The President in 1991 shortly after the legalization of gambling in Iowa. It later became the Rhythm City Casino, but the casino moved to a land-based site in the Northern part of Davenport in 2016. The former boat was still parked on the river in Davenport until late 2016. When the property moved additional outlets were added to the property including three restaurants, Ruthie's Steak & Seafood, Draft Day Sports Lounge, and Robert's Buffet. As well as a full service spa. Rhythm City's Event Center has brought several big acts through the Quad Cities including legendary acts like The Charlie Daniels Band, Eddie Money, Wayne Newton and Trace Adkins. Others who have performed since the opening in 2016 is Sara Evans, Gary Allan, Chris Janson, and Josh Turner. Several comedians have performed there also including Carlos Mencia, Frank Caliendo, and Craig Ferguson.

Property information
Rhythm City currently has over 32,000 square feet of gaming space with 1,000 slot machines, 25 table games, the Elite Sports Book, a hotel, three restaurants, a full service spa and an event center.

See also
List of casinos in Iowa

References

External links
 

Casinos in Iowa
2016 establishments in Iowa
Casinos completed in 2016
Buildings and structures in Davenport, Iowa